Os Eki Pou I Kardia Borei N' Antexi (Greek: Ως Εκεί Που Η Καρδιά Μπορεί Ν' Αντέξει; English: As Much As The Heart Can Stand) is the seventh album by Greek singer Natasa Theodoridou. It was released on 19 October 2005 by Sony BMG Greece and received gold certification, selling 20,000 units. The album has a majority of composed songs by popular Greek singer and composer, Michalis Hatzigiannis and it's characterized by the variety of musical sounds.

Track listing

Credits

Personnel 
Dimitris Antoniou: guitar (tracks: 1-3, 1-4, 2-1, 2-4, 2-9)
Dimitris Bellos: orchestration, programming (tracks: 1-3, 1-4, 2-1, 2-9)
Giannis Bithikotsis: baglama (tracks: 1-1, 1-8, 2-3) || bouzouki (tracks: 1-1, 1-2, 1-8, 2-3, 2-5) || cura (tracks: 1-8, 1-10)
Michalis Chatzigiannis: guitar, piano (tracks: 1-4) || second vocal (tracks: 2-1)
Thanasis Chondros: bass (tracks: 1-1, 1-2, 1-8, 1-10, 2-3, 2-5)
Akis Diximos: backing vocals (tracks: 2-6) || second vocal (tracks: 1-1, 1-2, 1-5, 1-8, 1-10, 2-2, 2-3, 2-5, 2-8, 2-10)
Spiros Dorizas: drums (tracks: 1-1, 1-2, 1-8, 1-10, 2-3, 2-5)
Thanos Gkiouletzis: violin (tracks: 1-2, 1-10, 2-5)
Babis Kemanetzidis: lyre (tracks: 2-6)
Katerina Kiriakou: backing vocals (tracks: 2-6)
Giorgos Lieros: violin (tracks: 1-7, 2-7)
Andreas Mouzakis: drums (tracks: 1-3, 1-4, 1-5, 1-6, 1-7, 2-1, 2-2, 2-4, 2-6, 2-7, 2-8, 2-9, 2-10)
Tasos Panagis: orchestration, programming (tracks: 1-1, 1-2, 1-8, 1-10, 2-3, 2-5)
Kiriakos Papadopoulos: orchestration, programming (tracks: 1-7, 2-2, 2-6, 2-7)
Stavros Pazarentsis: clarinet, ney (tracks: 1-7)
Christos Pertsinidis: guitar (tracks: 1-1, 1-2, 1-5, 1-7, 1-8, 1-10, 2-2, 2-3, 2-5, 2-6, 2-7, 2-8, 2-10)
Kostas Platakis: baglama (tracks: 1-5) || bouzouki (tracks: 1-5, 2-8, 2-10)
Tasos Sokorelis: guitar (tracks: 1-6)
Panagiotis Stergiou: baglama (tracks: 2-2) || bouzouki (tracks: 2-2, 2-6, 2-7) || mandolin (tracks: 2-7)
Zoi Tiganouria: accordion (tracks: 1-5, 2-10)
Giorgos Tzivelekis: bass (tracks: 1-3, 1-4, 1-5, 1-6, 1-7, 2-1, 2-2, 2-4, 2-6, 2-7, 2-8, 2-9, 2-10)
Charis Varthakouris: backing vocals, orchestration, programming (tracks: 2-4)
Babis Vichos: flute (tracks: 2-8)
Thanasis Vichos: orchestration, programming (tracks: 1-5, 1-6, 1-9, 2-8, 2-10)

Production 
Vasilis Bouloubasis: hair styling
Giannis Doulamis: executive producer
Thodoris Ikonomou (Sofita studio): assistant sound engineer
Giannis Ioannidis (D.P.H.): mastering
Iakovos Kalaitzakis: make up
Christos Karantzolas: photographer
Lefteris Neromiliotis (Sofita studio): mix engineer, sound engineer
Dimitris Rekouniotis: artwork
Giorgos Segredakis: styling
Petros Siakavellas (D.P.H.): mastering
Giorgos Tzivelekis (Sofita studio): assistant sound engineer

References

Natasa Theodoridou albums
Greek-language albums
2005 albums
Sony Music Greece albums